Stenopetala was a quarterly periodical and the official publication of The New Zealand Carnivorous Plant Society. Typical articles included matters of horticultural interest, field reports, literature reviews, and cultivar descriptions.

History and profile
The journal was established in 1982 as The New Zealand Carnivorous Plant Society Journal (or sometimes Bulletin). It was published under the title Stenopetala since 2002. The headquarters was in Auckland. It ended publication in 2016.

References

External links 
 

1982 establishments in New Zealand
2016 disestablishments in New Zealand
Carnivorous plant magazines
Defunct magazines published in New Zealand
Magazines established in 1982
Magazines disestablished in 2016
Mass media in Auckland
Magazines published in New Zealand
Quarterly magazines